Jacinta Anne Kennedy (née Hamilton, born 3 May 1982) is an Australian women's basketball player, who represented the country at both junior and senior levels. She most recently played for the Dandenong Rangers in the WNBL.

Personal life
Kennedy picked up the nickname "Little Awesome" from Melbourne's basketball writers in 1998 and is the younger sister of Lucille Hamilton. Kennedy is married to Socceroo player Josh Kennedy.

Career
Kennedy commenced playing in the Women's National Basketball League (WNBL) in 1999. Since then, Kennedy has played for the AIS (1999/00 to 2000/01), Canberra Capitals (2001/02) and Dandenong Rangers (2003/04 to 2005/06), totalling 125 games.

Kennedy was also selected to the WNBL All-Star Five on two occasions; 2003/04 and 2005/06. In season 2004/05, Kennedy was awarded the Grand Final Most Valuable Player. After nine years away from the game, she returned to the game in the Rangers uniform, now playing under her marital name, Jacinta Kennedy. After the 2016/17 season, Kennedy retired from her prolonged and impressive career. 

At official FIBA events, Kennedy played for Australia at the 2001 World Championship for Junior Women. At the 2006 Commonwealth Games held in Melbourne, Kennedy won a Gold medal.

References

1982 births
Living people
Australian women's basketball players
Australian Institute of Sport basketball (WNBL) players
Canberra Capitals players
Dandenong Rangers players
Commonwealth Games gold medallists for Australia
Commonwealth Games medallists in basketball
Basketball players at the 2006 Commonwealth Games
Forwards (basketball)
Centers (basketball)
Medallists at the 2006 Commonwealth Games